Karamlesh (also spelled Karemlash, Karemles, Karemlish, etc.) is an ethnic Chaldean town in northern Iraq located less than  south east of Mosul.

It is surrounded by many hills that along with it made up the historical Assyrian city of Kar-Mullissi (written URU.kar-dNIN.LÍL), which means "the city of Mullissu" in Akkadian. Residents of the town fled to Kurdistan Region following the invasion of the town by ISIS in August 2014. The town was liberated by Iraqi Security Forces from ISIS rule on October 24, 2016, as part of the larger Battle of Mosul.

History

Patriarchal seat of the Church of the East
Karemlash was the seat of the Nestorian patriarch Denha II (1336/7–1381/2) for at least part of his reign.  The continuator of the Ecclesiastical History of Bar Hebraeus mentions several contacts between Denha II and the Jacobite church in Karamlish between 1358 and 1364.  At this period Karemlash had Jacobite and Armenian communities alongside its Nestorian majority, and its village chiefs styled themselves 'emirs'.  The prosperity enjoyed by the village during the reign of Denha II presumably came to an end when the patriarchate was relocated to Mosul at an unknown date in the fourteenth or fifteenth century.

After Iraq War

Karemlash was relatively calm following the US-led Iraq War. In late 2003, the town came briefly under the control of the 101st Airborne Division (377th Parachute Field Artillery Battalion).

The town showed strong support towards the Assyrian Democratic Movement during the parliamentary and local elections in 2005, 2007 and 2010. The town also received thousands of Chaldeans and other Christian refugees from other parts of the country after waves of violence against them. In response to the influx of refugees, Sarkis Aghajan and the Supreme Committee of Christian Affairs built and renovated new homes, churches, cemeteries, infrastructure and a complex for Armenian Refugees, among other improvements.

On August 6, 2014, the Islamic State of Iraq and Syria took over the town, causing all of its inhabitants to flee to Erbil. During their occupation of the city, they burned an 80-year-old Chaldean woman to death for "failing to comply with the strict laws of the Islamic State" and destroyed a large portion of the historic Mar Behnam Monastery.

On October 24, 2016, the city was liberated by the Iraqi Army, which on the same day, returned crosses to the domes of some of the main churches.
Sarkis Aghajan

Security
The Nineveh Plain Protection Units currently run the security in the Town

See also
List of Assyrian settlements
Assyrian homeland
Assyrians in Iraq
Proposals for Assyrian autonomy in Iraq
Bartella
Bakhdida

Gallery

References
Originally based on an article by Habib Hannona and Fred Aprim on karemlash.com, licensed under the GNU Free Documentation License, used with permission.

Assyrian communities in Iraq
Populated places in Nineveh Governorate
Nineveh Plains